Naert is a surname. Notable people with the surname include:

 Jean Naert (1904–1962), Belgian racing cyclist
 Koen Naert (born 1989), Belgian athlete
 Philippe Naert (born 1943), Belgian organizational theorist

See also
 Nauert